Prizren Fortress (Prizrenski grad) is a hilltop fortification in Prizren in Kosovo. It overlooks the Prizren River which flows through Prizren, which developed around the fortress. The site of the fortress of Prizren has seen habitation and use since the Bronze Age (ca. 2000). In late antiquity it was part of the defensive fortification system in western Dardania and was reconstructed in the era of eastern Roman Emperor Justinian. Byzantine rule in the region ended definitively in 1219–20 as the Serbian Nemanjić dynasty controlled the fort until 1371. 

Since 1371, a series of regional feudal rulers came to control Prizren and its fort: the Balšić, the Dukagjini, the Hrebeljanović and finally the Branković, often with Ottoman support. The Ottoman Empire assumed direct control after 1450 and over time turned the fort into a central stronghold in the Eyalet of Rumelia. Much of the modern fortress dates to the 18th century reconstruction phase.

The fortress is situated on a dominant hill at the eastern part of the town of Prizren, set on a strategic position, contoured with lines that follow distinguished features of the terrain's natural morphology. Archaeological excavations were carried out in 1969 and then again in 2004 and 2009–2011. They resulted in the discovery of the infrastructure, which incorporates rampart walls enforced with towers, casemates, labyrinth corridors, depots, and other accompanying inner rooms and dwellings. It was declared a Monument of Culture of Exceptional Importance in 1948.

Name 
The Prizren fortress is named Kalaja e Prizrenit in Albanian and Prizrenska Kaljaja in South-Slavic. The historical neighbourhood which formed around the lower part of the fortress is named Nënkalaja (literally "below the fortress").

History 

Prizren has been traditionally identified with Theranda, a town of the Roman era. Another location which may have been that of Theranda is present-day Suhareka Archaeological research has shown that the site of the fortress has passed several eras of habitation since prehistoric times. In its lower part, material from the upper part of the fort has been deposited over the centuries. It dates from the Bronze Age (c. 2000 BCE) to the late Iron Age (c. 1st century CE) and is comparable to the material found in the nearby prehistoric site in the village of Vlashnjë. In late antiquity, the fortification saw a phase of reconstruction. It is part of a series of forts that were built or reconstructed in the same period by Justinian along the White Drin in northern Albania and western Kosovo in the routes that linked the coastal areas with the Kosovo valley. At this time, the Prizren fortress likely appears in historical record as Petrizen in the 6th century CE in the work of Procopius as one of the fortifications which Justinian commissioned to be reconstructed in Dardania.

Present-day Prizren is first mentioned in 1019 at the time of Basil II (r. 976–1025) in the form of Prisdriana.In 1072, the leaders of the Bulgarian Uprising of Georgi Voiteh traveled from their center in Skopje in the area of Prizren and held a meeting in which they invited Mihailo Vojislavljević of Duklja to send them assistance. Mihailo sent his son, Constantine Bodin with 300 of his soldiers. Dalassenos Doukas, dux of Bulgaria was sent against the combined forced but was defeated near Prizren, which was extensively plundered by the Serbian army after the battle. The Bulgarian magnates proclaimed Bodin "Emperor of the Bulgarians" after this initial victory. They were defeated by Nikephoros Bryennios in the area of northern Macedonia by the end of 1072. Demetrios Chomatenos is the last Byzantine archbishop of Ohrid to include Prizren in his jurisdiction until 1219. Stefan Nemanja had seized the surrounding area along the White Drin in 1185–95 and the ecclesiastical split from the Patriarchate in 1219 was the final act of establishing Nemanjić rule in the town. Prizren and its fort were the administrative and economic center of the župa of Podrimlje (in Albanian, Podrima or Anadrini).

In the Middle Ages, the Prizren fortress was part of the fortifications of the Via de Zenta trade route which passed through the Drin valley and connected the Adriatic coastline with the central Balkans. In a nearby location, roughly 3 km to the southeast of the Prizren fortress, Stefan Dušan commissioned the building of the Monastery of the Holy Archangels and the Višegrad fort, which is also known as Dušanov grad. For a time, they were the fortifications of his court in Prizren before he moved it to Skopje. The város (nënkalaja - old town) of Prizren developed around the fortress. Ragusan traders were stationed in the old town. Prizren over time became a trading hub and gateway for Ragusan trade towards eastern Kosovo and beyond.

Prizren became part of the Ottoman Empire after 1450 until the First Balkan War (1912). The present-day fortress is largely the product of Ottoman expansion and reconstruction in the 18th century.

During the Ottoman occupation of Serbia, Serbs held social gatherings at several monumental places, such as Kaljaja, where they danced the Kolo in the evening.

Gallery

See also 
Late Antiquity and Medieval sites in Kosovo
List of fortresses in Kosovo
Tourism in Kosovo

Notes

References

Sources

External links 

Cultural Monuments of Exceptional Importance (Serbia)
Buildings and structures in Prizren
Monuments and memorials in Kosovo
Medieval Serbian sites in Kosovo
Former capitals of Serbia
Forts in Kosovo
Byzantine forts
Stefan Dušan
Cultural heritage monuments in Prizren District